Singarakonda is a holy village situated on the banks of the Bhavanasi lake in the Prakasam district of the Indian state of Andhra Pradesh.

References 
 www.singarakonda.com/
 www.ongoleinfo.com/singarakonda.php
 http://www.telugupeople.com/news/article_00095687_Singarakonda_Tirunallu_fete_concludes.asp
 http://www.teluguwishesh.com/anveshana/234-anveshana/64301-singarakonda-kshetram-history-lord-anjaneya-temples-ugra-narasimha-swamy-stories.html
 
 http://www.thehindu.com/news/national/andhra-pradesh/hanuman-jayanthi-celebrated-with-zeal/article7203447.ece

Villages in Prakasam district